Taung Pyinthe (lit. "Queen of the Southern Palace") was a queen consort of King Sithu I of the Pagan Dynasty of Myanmar (Burma).

The royal chronicles do not state her personal name or any other distinguishing titles. Based on her title as Queen of the Southern Palace, she technically should have been the chief queen but chronicles list her fourth in line behind queens Yadanabon, Ti Lawka Sanda Dewi and Yazakumari. Chronicles also say that all four senior queens participated in Sithu's coronation ceremony when traditionally only the chief queen would.

The queen and Sithu I had two daughters: Taung Phya and Shwe Kyu. Her younger sister Khin U, a four-time widow and mother of four daughters, became a consort of Sithu I.

References

Bibliography
 
 

Queens consort of Pagan
11th-century Burmese women
12th-century Burmese women